Leo "Ace" Gottlieb (November 28, 1920 – August 16, 1972) was an American professional basketball player.

Early and personal life
Gottlieb, who was Jewish, was born in New York City, New York.  He attended DeWitt Clinton High School in The Bronx, New York.

Gottlieb was the uncle of Ron Rothstein, first coach of the Miami Heat.

Basketball career
Gottlieb played guard.  He played for the Philadelphia Sphas in the ABL in 1939–40, the New York Jewels in 1940–42, the New York Americans in 1943–44, and the New York Gothams in 1945–46.

He made his debut in the National Basketball Association on November 1, 1946. He played for the New York Knicks in the first game in NBA history, on November 1, 1946, scoring (14 points). He played for the Knicks from 1946–48.

BAA career statistics

Regular season

Playoffs

References

1920 births
1972 deaths
American men's basketball players
Basketball players from New York City
DeWitt Clinton High School alumni
Guards (basketball)
Jewish men's basketball players
New York Knicks players
Philadelphia Sphas players
Sportspeople from Brooklyn
20th-century American Jews